Vartiosaari is a district of Helsinki, Finland.

External links 
 

Neighbourhoods of Helsinki